James Edward Greene (born in Greenville, Sinoe County on 6 July 1914 – 22 July 1977) was a Liberian politician. He served as the country's 24th vice president from April 1972 until his death on 22 July 1977.

References

Americo-Liberian people
People of Americo-Liberian descent
Vice presidents of Liberia
Commanders Crosses of the Order of Merit of the Federal Republic of Germany
1914 births
1977 deaths
20th-century Liberian politicians